The Bhojpuri Wikipedia (Bhojpuri: 𑂦𑂷𑂔𑂣𑂳𑂩𑂲 𑂥𑂱𑂍𑂱𑂣𑂲𑂙𑂱𑂨𑂰) is the Bhojpuri language version of Wikipedia, run by the Wikimedia Foundation. The site was launched on February 21, 2003. Bhojpuri is today written in the Devanagari script. Bhojpuri is an Indo-Aryan language spoken in northern-eastern India and the Terai region of Nepal. It is  It is chiefly spoken in western Bihar and eastern Uttar Pradesh.  The language is a minority language in Fiji, Guyana, Mauritius, South Africa, Suriname, and Trinidad and Tobago.

Users and editors

References 

Wikipedias by language
Wikipedia in India